Roberto Heras Hernández (born 1 February 1974) is a Spanish former professional road bicycle racer who won the Vuelta a España a record four times. Between 1997 and 2005 he finished in the top 5 of the Vuelta every year except 1998 when he finished 6th. He won a record-tying three times, and then broke the record with a fourth win in 2005, but he was eventually disqualified after being accused of taking EPO. Heras chose to fight the accusations and this resulted in a lengthy court case and appeal process.

In June 2011, Heras successfully appealed against the disqualification in the civil court of Castilla y León, and this decision was upheld in the Spanish supreme court in December 2012. The Spanish cycling federation subsequently reinstated Heras as 2005 Vuelta champion.

Early career
Heras turned professional in 1995 for the Spanish cycling team Kelme. His first win as a pro came in 1996 in the Subida al Naranco. Later that year he won the 12th stage of the Vuelta a España. Next year he won another stage at the Vuelta and the Clásica de Amorebieta. In 1999 he won stages at the Volta a Catalunya and the Giro d'Italia, and he stood for the first time on the Vuelta's podium, third despite not winning a stage. In 2000 he took two stages and the overall win, which attracted the US Postal cycling team.

Riding with Lance Armstrong
From 2001, he raced alongside Lance Armstrong on the US Postal Service team. As a climbing specialist, he assisted Armstrong in the mountain stages of the Tour de France. Heras achieved his highest position in the Tour when he finished fifth in 2000.

During the 2002 Tour de France Lance Armstrong was in 2nd place overall going into stage 11 where the race entered the high mountains. Going up the final climb on the Tourmalet Heras set such a dominating pace at the front of the fragmented Peloton that all of Armstrong's rivals were dropped with the exception of Joseba Beloki. The ride put in by Heras set up Armstrong to take over the Yellow Jersey from the ONCE–Eroski team led by Beloki, Abraham Olano and Igor González de Galdeano who was in the overall lead at the start of Stage 11. Beloki finished 2nd overall in the stage as Heras came in 3rd with both riders behind Armstrong who finally launched his attack for the stage win. The next day in Stage 12 once again Roberto Heras set such a furious pace on the final climb that all of Armstrong's rivals were dropped with the exception of Beloki except this time it was Heras who crossed in 2nd while Beloki took third.

Dominating the Vuelta a España
He had, however, already established himself as a contender for honours in other Tours. He was fifth and a stage winner in the 1997 Vuelta, sixth (and another stage victory) a year later, and third in 1999; that year he finished sixth and won a stage in the Giro d'Italia. His first Vuelta win came in 2000 (when he also won two stages and the points classification), and he won again in 2003.

At the end of 2003, he left US Postal to lead the Spanish Liberty Seguros team. He was thought to be a contender for the 2004 Tour de France but abandoned after the 16th stage due to lack of fitness. Heras entered the Vuelta a España and won, equalling Tony Rominger's record three wins. During the first mountain stages, it seemed an easy win but in the last week he had a challenge from Santiago Pérez.

In the 2005 Vuelta a España, Heras won two mountain stages (including the Estación de Esquí de Pajares) and lost the last time trial by less than a second, something nobody expected from the non-time-trial-specialist Heras. Heras won for the fourth time, a record.

However, a drug test in November 2005, two months after the race, showed a positive test for EPO from the day of time trial (stage 20). Heras was fired and faced a two-year suspension. His Vuelta win was given to second-place finisher, Russian Denis Menchov.

Heras appealed, alleging inaccuracies in the testing and mishandling of his samples. He appealed this decision in the civil court of Castilla y León, and was successful. The Spanish cycling federation appealed at the Spanish supreme court, but in December 2012 this court upheld the decision; the Spanish cycling federation subsequently reinstated Heras as 2005 champion and Heras went on to sue the federation for over one million euro in purported lost earnings. In January 2016, Heras was awarded €724,000 in compensation from the Spanish state, a sentence that was confirmed on 9 May 2017.

Career achievements

Major results

1996
 10th Klasika Primavera de Amorebieta
1997
 1st Subida al Naranco
 3rd Clásica a los Puertos de Guadarrama
 5th Overall Vuelta a España
1st Stage 12
 8th Overall Vuelta a Murcia
 9th Overall Setmana Catalana de Ciclisme
1998
 1st Klasika Primavera de Amorebieta
 2nd Subida al Naranco
 3rd Clásica a los Puertos de Guadarrama
 4th Trofeo Forla de Navarra
 5th Overall Vuelta a La Rioja
 6th Overall Vuelta a España
1st Stage 19
 6th Overall Vuelta a Asturias
 8th Overall Vuelta a Aragón
 10th Overall Paris–Nice
 10th Overall Setmana Catalana de Ciclisme
1999
 1st Klasika Primavera de Amorebieta
 2nd Road race, National Road Championships
 2nd Overall Volta a Catalunya
1st Stage 6
 2nd Gran Premio de Llodio
 3rd Overall Vuelta a España
 5th Overall Giro d'Italia
1st Stage 21
 5th Overall Tour of Galicia
2000
 1st  Overall Vuelta a España
1st  Points classification 
1st Stages 7 & 20
 1st Stage 5 Euskal Bizikleta
 3rd Overall Vuelta a La Rioja
 3rd Klasika Primavera de Amorebieta
 3rd Clásica a los Puertos de Guadarrama
 5th Overall Tour de France
 5th Overall Tour of Galicia
 6th Overall Vuelta a Asturias
2001
 2nd Overall Vuelta a Aragón
 4th Overall Vuelta a España
2002
 1st  Overall Volta a Catalunya
1st Stage 1 (TTT)
 2nd Overall Vuelta a España
1st  Combination classification
1st Stages 6 & 15
Held  after Stages 15–20
Held  after Stage 18 
 8th Overall Vuelta a Burgos
 9th Overall Tour de France
2003
 1st  Overall Vuelta a España
1st Stage 20
 1st Stage 4 (TTT) Tour de France
 2nd Overall Volta a Catalunya
2004
 1st  Overall Vuelta a España
1st  Combination classification
1st Stage 12
Held  after Stages 12–16
 1st  Overall Euskal Bizikleta
 5th Overall Clásica Internacional de Alcobendas
2005
 1st  Overall Vuelta a España
1st Stages 6 & 15
Held  after Stages 15–20
Held  after Stage 6 
Held  after Stages 6–8
 9th Overall Setmana Catalana de Ciclisme
2009
 1st Brompton World Championships

Grand Tour general classification results timeline

See also
 List of doping cases in cycling
List of sportspeople sanctioned for doping offences

References

External links
 

1974 births
Living people
People from Béjar
Sportspeople from the Province of Salamanca
Cyclists from Castile and León
Doping cases in cycling
Vuelta a España winners
Spanish Vuelta a España stage winners
Spanish Giro d'Italia stage winners
Spanish male cyclists